Coleophora kotalensis is a moth of the family Coleophoridae.

References

kotalensis
Moths described in 1994